David Sánchez was the defending champion but lost in the semifinals to Gustavo Kuerten.

Fernando González won in the final 7–5, 6–4 against Kuerten.

Seeds

  Nicolás Massú (quarterfinals)
  Gustavo Kuerten (final)
  Mariano Zabaleta (quarterfinals)
  Gastón Gaudio (quarterfinals)
  Fernando González (champion)
  Juan Ignacio Chela (first round)
  Filippo Volandri (quarterfinals)
  Flávio Saretta (semifinals)

Draw

Finals

Top half

Bottom half

External links
 Singles draw

Chile Open (tennis)
2004 ATP Tour

it:Movistar Open 2004 - Singolare
sk:Mužská dvojhra na Movistar Open 2004